The 2015 Erste Bank Open was a men's tennis tournament played on indoor hard courts. It was the 41st edition of the event, and part of the ATP World Tour 500 Series of the 2015 ATP World Tour. It was held at the Wiener Stadthalle in Vienna, Austria, from 19 October until 25 October 2015. First-seeded David Ferrer won the singles title.

Points and prize money

Point distribution

Prize money

Singles main-draw entrants

Seeds

 Rankings are as of October 12, 2015

Other entrants
The following players received wildcards into the singles main draw:
  Tommy Haas
  Gerald Melzer
  Dennis Novak

The following players received entry from the qualifying draw:
  Kenny de Schepper
  Lucas Miedler
  Jan-Lennard Struff
  Yūichi Sugita

Withdrawals
Before the tournament
  Sam Groth →replaced by Jerzy Janowicz
  Florian Mayer →replaced by Sergiy Stakhovsky
  Milos Raonic →replaced by Paolo Lorenzi

Doubles main-draw entrants

Seeds

 Rankings are as of October 12, 2015

Other entrants
The following pairs received wildcards into the doubles main draw:
  Andreas Haider-Maurer /  Oliver Marach
  Julian Knowle /  Daniel Nestor

The following pair received entry from the qualifying draw:
  Rajeev Ram /  Radek Štěpánek

Finals

Singles

  David Ferrer defeated  Steve Johnson 4–6, 6–4, 7–5

Doubles

  Łukasz Kubot /  Marcelo Melo  defeated  Jamie Murray /  John Peers  4–6, 7–6(7–3), [10–6]

References

External links
 
 ATP tournament profile

Erste Bank Open
Vienna Open
Erste Bank Open